The 2007 NASCAR Nextel Cup Series was the 59th season of professional stock car racing in the United States and the 36th modern-era Cup series. Beginning on February 10 at Daytona International Speedway with the Budweiser Shootout, the season ended on November 18 at Homestead-Miami Speedway with the Ford 400.  The Chase for the Nextel Cup started with the Sylvania 300 at New Hampshire International Speedway and was contested over the final ten races.

The season was the final year that the NASCAR Cup Series was known as the Nextel Cup Series. As a result of the 2005 merger of Nextel Communications with Sprint Corporation, and the subsequent decision by the newly named Sprint Corporation, the name of the series was changed to the Sprint Cup Series for 2008. The 2007 season was the first year in NASCAR history in which no North Carolina drivers found victory lane. This was also the final year for the Chevrolet Monte Carlo which was replaced by the Chevrolet Impala during the Car of Tomorrow races and full time in 2008.

Jimmie Johnson of Hendrick Motorsports won his second consecutive championship, with teammate Jeff Gordon finishing second.  Chevrolet captured the NASCAR Manufacturers' Championship with 26 wins, and 290 points over second-place Ford who had 7 wins and 208 points.  Dodge finished third with 3 wins and 178 points and Toyota, in their first NEXTEL Cup season, finished out with no wins and 116 points.

Top stories and controversies

Changes in the points system and The Chase
It was officially announced on January 22 at the annual NASCAR Media Tour in Charlotte, North Carolina that two changes were made for the 2007 Chase for the Nextel Cup.

The first is that wins became more important.  The driver who finishes first now received 185 points instead of 180. Including the five bonus points for leading a lap and the possible five bonus points for leading the most laps, a driver could now get a maximum of 195 points for winning a race.

The other changes involved the actual Chase.  The Top 12 drivers after the Chevy Rock & Roll 400 automatically qualified for the 2007 Chase. Additionally, each driver had their points reset to 5,000, plus ten for each win during the first 26 races. However, when the season ended, only the Top 10 drivers would be honored at the annual banquet in New York City at the Waldorf-Astoria.

Car of Tomorrow

NASCAR introduced a new car style known as the "Car of Tomorrow" for use in sixteen races in 2007. This car was the result of a design program that started after the death of Dale Earnhardt in the 2001 Daytona 500. It was intended to offer improvements in safety, performance, competition, and cost efficiency. Plans for a partial schedule in 2008 were expanded to full usage after race results and owner feedback led to acceptance of the new car. Some drivers, however, offered criticism over the decision, thinking that the new design led to boring, uncompetitive races.

AT&T, Inc. vs. NASCAR
AT&T and BellSouth's Cingular brand, sponsor of Richard Childress Racing's No. 31 car, was legally renamed AT&T upon BellSouth acquisition by AT&T, and has been phased out. This is not allowed under the grandfather clause in the original sponsorship agreement between the former Nextel Communications (now Sprint Nextel) with NASCAR and on March 16, it was announced that AT&T had filed suit in Atlanta Federal Court seeking to overturn said grandfather clause because of this and allow AT&T decals on the car.  A judge ruled that RCR was allowed to put AT&T decals on the car on May 18, and the decals made their debut the following night in the Nextel All-Star Challenge. NASCAR originally had a say when the judge ruled in RCR's favor, but that was later rescinded.

The legal wrangling continued as on June 17, NASCAR countersued AT&T for $100 million (US). NASCAR won the appeal on August 13, and eleven days later at the Bristol Motor Speedway, NASCAR ordered AT&T logos removed from the No. 31 car, and AT&T filed for an injunction to get the decals back on. Sprint Nextel, AT&T, and NASCAR settled their differences on September 7, and the AT&T logos were placed back on Burton's ride in time for the Chevy Rock & Roll 400. These features would remain on the car's body for the rest of the season and into 2008, but RCR afterwards found a new sponsor to replace AT&T. When Caterpillar signed on for the 2009 season, the team agreed to have them as the No. 31's main sponsor.

Robby Gordon and Motorola
Motorola is an associate sponsor on Robby Gordon's No. 7 car. When his self-owned team, however, tried to put a Motorola decal on the car for the Kobalt Tools 500 at Atlanta Motor Speedway on March 18, NASCAR ruled that this was in breach of the exclusivity clause with Sprint Nextel (even though Nextel uses Motorola phones) because NASCAR noticed this deal was part of Cellco Partnership (a joint partnership of Verizon and Vodafone better known as the trade name Verizon Wireless), which (legally) sponsored his Busch Series car. NASCAR and Sprint later relented as it was decided to allow Motorola's Audio Products Division to be the main sponsor.

Shell logo controversy
Another controversy surrounded Shell and Sunoco. Sunoco does exclusively supply gasoline to NASCAR, yet RCR signed Shell and their Pennzoil brand to the No. 29 car driven by Daytona 500 winner Kevin Harvick. During the 500, the car had large Shell decals and large Shell logos on uniforms worn by Harvick and his team. Shell logos were ordered to be smaller for the following week's race at Auto Club. This was likely done at Sunoco's request since a rival gasoline company sponsored a car winning NASCAR's premier event, having taken away publicity from an official sponsor.

Mark Martin's schedule
The other concerned the part-time schedule being undertaken by Mark Martin.  Through the spring Atlanta race, Martin held the points lead.  Because he had planned a part-time schedule in the No. 01 Ginn Racing U.S. Army ride, Martin reiterated that he would not run in all 36 races on the circuit despite finishing second in the Daytona 500.  He relinquished the lead by passing on the spring races at Bristol and Martinsville.  Rookie drivers Regan Smith and Aric Almirola drove the No. 01 car in those races, as owner points had that car an exempt team for Bristol (from 2006) and Martinsville. However, Martin extended his schedule to include a few more points races, but did not race the full season.

Dale Earnhardt Jr. signs 5-year contract with Hendrick Motorsports
On May 10, it was announced that Dale Earnhardt Jr. would be leaving the No. 8 Budweiser Chevrolet following the conclusion of the season as he could not get a contract extension with Dale Earnhardt, Inc., the driving team his father founded and run by his stepmother, Teresa Earnhardt.  Speculation according to WFXT in Boston had him going to Richard Childress Racing where the "unretirement" of the No. 3 car that his father drove to seven then-Winston Cup championships and the 1998 Daytona 500 would have happened. Other rumors had him going to Joe Gibbs Racing, or had him starting a Nextel Cup team with the organization he owns that fields Busch Series cars, JR Motorsports. However, at a press conference on June 13, Dale Earnhardt Jr. announced a five-year deal to join Hendrick Motorsports. He replaced Kyle Busch, who at the time drove the No. 5 Chevrolet; he subsequently joined Joe Gibbs Racing to replace J. J. Yeley in the No. 18 Toyota. Busch was replaced in the No. 5 by Casey Mears. On September 19, it was announced that Jr. had signed on to drive Hendrick's new No. 88 Mountain Dew AMP/National Guard Chevrolet. Junior's crew chief at DEI, Tony Eury Jr. will make the move with him, leaving his position after the fall race at Talladega.

Merger Mania
Before the season-opening Daytona 500, NASCAR team owner Jack Roush announced the selloff of 50% of his team, Roush Racing to the Fenway Sports Group, who owns the Boston Red Sox Major League Baseball team. The newly formed alliance between two differing sports markets involved the team name to change to Roush Fenway Racing. However, this was only the beginning of what was referred to as "Merger mania".

The week before the Allstate 400 at The Brickyard became the week NASCAR was all shaken up in the ownership boxes. On July 24, Dale Earnhardt, Inc. merged with Ginn Racing, inheriting the No. 01 US Army ride of Mark Martin and Aric Almirola, putting the points earned by the No. 14 team points earned to Paul Menard's No. 15 team and the closure of the No. 13 team while releasing Sterling Marlin and Joe Nemechek.  The next day, Newman/Haas/Lanigan Racing, a regular in the Champ Car World Series, returned after a prolonged absence by buying Robert Yates Racing NASCAR team, and renamed the combined operation Yates/Newman/Haas/Lanigan Racing. With the announced retirement of Robert Yates, however, the merger was called off and the team was named Yates Racing with Robert's son Doug Yates at the helm. Another merger was announced on August 6 when former crew chief Ray Evernham announced the merger of his team, Evernham Motorsports, with George N. Gillett Jr., owner of the National Hockey League team the Montreal Canadiens and co-owner of the English Premier League soccer team Liverpool. The merger was similar to the Roush Fenway merger as the new team was called Gillett Evernham Motorsports. During the weekend of the Sharp AQUOS 500, Hall of Fame Racing owners Troy Aikman and Roger Staubach, former football players for the Dallas Cowboys, announced their merger with Major League Baseball's Arizona Diamondbacks CEO Jeff Moorad and COO Tom Garfinkel. Michael Waltrip Racing Holdings LLC, a company created as a 50–50 partnership between Robert Kauffman and Michael Waltrip, was announced the weekend of the Bank of America 500 at Lowe's Motor Speedway. Waltrip, a two-time Daytona 500 winner, originally formed MWR in 1996. Cal Wells, himself a former owner in NASCAR was named the team's chief executive officer.

Joe Gibbs Racing to Toyota
During the season rumors began to surface that Joe Gibbs Racing, owned by then-Washington Redskins coach Joe Gibbs, would be switching to the new manufacturer Toyota for the 2008 season. This switch would be significant for several reasons, one of them being that JGR had been allied with General Motors since its inception in 1992, first with Chevrolet then beginning in 1997 with Pontiac, then switched back to Chevrolet in 2003, a year before Pontiac left NASCAR. The switch to Toyota would benefit the manufacturer itself, as they would be allied with a championship-caliber team. As JGR loans equipment to Hall of Fame Racing, the team confirmed that they would also switch to Toyota if JGR did so. On September 5, the rumors were confirmed.

Dale Jarrett announces retirement
During the race weekend for the Bank of America 500 at Lowe's Motor Speedway, Michael Waltrip Racing held a press conference. During the announcement, besides the announcement of a new part-owner on Robert Kaufmann and Cal Wells being named CEO, it was revealed to the racing world that 1999 Cup champion and three-time Daytona 500 winner Dale Jarrett would retire from full-time driving following the end of the 2007 season. In 2008, Jarrett drove in the first five points races, then handed the No. 44 Toyota to David Reutimann for the Goody's Cool Orange 500. As Jarrett was the 1999 champion, entering the first five races, regardless of his previous standings, guaranteed his No. 44 in the field, as well as driving in the Budweiser Shootout and the NASCAR Sprint All-Star Race.

Teams and drivers
Each Nextel Cup race had a field of 43 cars.

For the first five races of 2007, the top 35 teams in owners points (not drivers' points) in 2006 earned an exemption into each race.  If a driver went to a new team, he did not have a guaranteed starting spot, but his old team did, except if that new team was an exempt team.  If a past champion is not driving for an exempt team (outside the top 35 in owner points), he may be eligible to use a past champions' provisional to enter the race. The provisional guarantees a spot to the most recent champion not exempt, but those who are former champions will be limited to six for the entire 2007 season.

Teams not exempt must "race" their way in during qualifying – if 47 cars are attempting to make the race, and no one is using a provisional, then there are 12 cars racing for eight spots, and the eight fastest cars will make the race.  (The Daytona 500, which uses a different qualifying procedure, is the only exception to this rule, though the top 35 are still locked in.)

Starting with the sixth race in 2007, the top 35 teams were awarded exemptions for the next race.

Complete schedule
List of the NASCAR Nextel Cup Series teams in 2007 (45 full-time).

Limited schedule

The 36 team usually driven by Jeremy Mayfield ran Infineon as the 23 with Butch Leitzinger behind the wheel. Mayfield's sponsor, 360 OTC, had an agreement with Bill Davis Racing and Caterpillar Inc. for the 36 to run as 23 with Leitzinger, because California is the home state of Caterpillar. The 36 would return the following race.

Schedule

Races

Regular season

Budweiser Shootout
This non-points race, which involves the previous season's pole winners and past Shootout winners, was held on Saturday, February 10, at Daytona International Speedway officially kicking off Speedweeks.  Two-time series champion Tony Stewart took the checkered flag, but as he did so, Dale Earnhardt Jr. made contact with the back bumper of Elliott Sadler, causing a five-car wreck less than 1000 feet from the start/finish line.

One of the biggest headlines for the Shootout was that it would be the first Nextel Cup race to feature Toyota, and in the draw for starting spots, Dale Jarrett, a Toyota driver, drew the pole position.  However, he slid to the back within four laps of the start, and stayed there for most of the race.  Brian Vickers, the other Toyota driver in the event, started fourth, and though he went back-and-forth through the field, finished eighth.

Daytona 500

Qualifying and Gatorade Duel
Qualifying for the front row of the 2007 Daytona 500 took place on February 11. Robert Yates Racing swept the front row with the No. 38 Ford Fusion of David Gilliland winning the pole and the No. 88 of teammate Ricky Rudd finishing second.

Rule-breaking tactics, however, swirled around the qualifying.  Five teams were slapped with suspensions, fines and points deductions for illegal modifications.  The hardest hit was Michael Waltrip, whose No. 55 team was the most harshly punished, having their race director and crew chief suspended indefinitely, fined $100,000 (US) and the docking of 100 owners and drivers points for a gelatin-like substance found in the intake manifold during inspections before the qualifying, and in a replacement manifold after qualifying.  The substance was revealed by NASCAR, during the announcement of the penalties, to be an unspecified oxygenate compound that was blended with the fuel, possibly in an attempt to defeat the effect of the restrictor plate. Waltrip fired said crew chief for the unauthorized change that neither he or anyone else authorized. The No. 17 Matt Kenseth team of Roush Racing and the No. 9 Kasey Kahne team from Evernham Motorsports had their crew chiefs suspended for the first four races, fined $50,000 and had 50 driver and owner points taken away for illegal modifications discovered in post-qualifying inspections.  All three teams also had their qualifying times for the pole positions disqualified, and Waltrip's original car was impounded by NASCAR, forcing him to go to a back-up auto for the first qualifying race.

Additionally, two other Evernham teams – the No. 10 of Scott Riggs and the No. 19 of Elliott Sadler – had their crew chiefs suspended for the first two races of the season, slapped with $25,000 fines and deductions of 25 owner and driver points.  Unlike the other three teams, their times were allowed to stand and kept their starting positions for the qualifying doubleheader as those violations were found in pre-qualifying inspections.

Another story during Speedweeks was that 1966 Rookie of the Year James Hylton would attempt to make his first cup race since 1993 in a car prepared by Richard Childress Racing.

Gilliland sat on the pole for the first of the Gatorade Duel races on February 15, which establishes the starting order for the Super Bowl of NASCAR Racing, while Rudd was on the point for the second race, which both aired on Speed as part of the new NASCAR TV package.

Top ten results

The race
The race was hotly contested by many, with many stories abound. From Toyota attempting to emotionally rebound after Michael Waltrip's loss of not only his crew chief and VP of Competition, but also losing 100 driver and owner points. Other stories were Jeff Gordon's disqualification after winning his Gatorade Duel, and Tony Stewart's Speedweeks domination, attempting to win the Bud Shootout, the Duel, and the Daytona 500. The first few laps were incident free except for a spin by road racing veteran Boris Said. The race was dominated by Tony Stewart and Kurt Busch. Both combined for a total of 130 of 200 laps. However, with just under a quarter of the laps to go, Tony got loose in Turn 4 while Busch was unable to avoid Stewart and turned him into the wall in a crash that looked like the one that killed Dale Earnhardt in 2001, exactly six years to that date. From that point on, it was a game of survival of the fastest as defending race winner Jimmie Johnson, outside polesitter Ricky Rudd, and fan favorite Dale Earnhardt Jr. were taken out in incidents throughout the day. A red flag was brought out in a crash involving Jamie McMurray, Rudd, and Junior. At the time of the flag, Mark Martin, who had not won the Great American Race in 22 tries, was in the lead with his ex-teammates behind him. On the restart, everyone attempted to pass Mark on the low line, but he successfully blocked. However, charging up the outside was Kevin Harvick who came from 8th with half a lap to go to take the lead heading into the fourth turn. However, the Big One would finally occur on the last lap as Kyle Busch hit the apron and spun, causing a chain reaction crash. Despite the incidents, NASCAR officials did not freeze the field and let Harvick and Martin duke it out in the last hundred yards. In one of the closest 500s since the inaugural in 1959, Kevin Harvick passed Mark Martin to the stripe by 0.020 seconds, becoming the 31st different winner of the Great American Race.

Auto Club 500

The Auto Club 500, NASCAR's second points race of the season, and what many people consider "the first real race of the season" (without the restrictor plates run at Daytona) was held at California Speedway on February 25.  This race was the first run in Nextel Cup series history with unleaded gasoline, as all three major series began running Sunoco 260 GT Plus, a 104-octane (R+M/2) unleaded racing fuel, starting with this race. Jeff Gordon won his first pole of the season. Matt Kenseth swept the Busch and Cup Series races at Fontana, and Toyota gained its first top-10 in the Nextel Cup Series.

UAW-DaimlerChrysler 400

The UAW-DaimlerChrysler 400, NASCAR's third race of the season, was held at the newly refurbished Las Vegas Motor Speedway on March 11. Kasey Kahne won the pole. This would be the final race with the UAW-DaimlerChrysler name; starting in 2008 after Daimler Benz sold off Chrysler, the race would be renamed the UAW-Dodge 400. This race marked the first time since the 1965 Firecracker 400 that the top 10 starters finished outside the top 10.

Kobalt Tools 500

The fourth race of the season, the Kobalt Tools 500, was held at Atlanta Motor Speedway on March 18. Ryan Newman won the pole, his seventh at Atlanta, but started 43rd after blowing an engine in Saturday practice.

Food City 500

The fifth race of the season, the Food City 500, was held at Bristol Motor Speedway on March 25. the last before the fabled high banks were repaved with new concrete for the August race under the lights with progressive banking.

Jeff Gordon won the first CoT Pole Position in NASCAR history, but this race was the first race without Joe Nemechek participating in five years as he failed to qualify on speed as his No. 13 Ginn Racing team missed the show.  However, Jeremy Mayfield (Bill Davis Racing No. 36) and A. J. Allmendinger (Team Red Bull No. 84) both started their first race of the season.

Goody's Cool Orange 500

The Goody's Cool Orange 500, the sixth race of the season was held at Martinsville Speedway on April 1, as this race was the second race to feature the Car of Tomorrow and the first of the season to use the 2007 owners' points to lock in the top 35 teams for qualification. Denny Hamlin won the pole for this race, and Jimmie Johnson was the race winner.

Samsung 500

The Samsung 500, the seventh race of the season was held at Texas Motor Speedway on April 15. Qualifying was cancelled due to a wild tornado outbreak and the field was set by current owners' points, as a result Jeff Gordon started from the pole. He finished a respectable fourth place, but the race was won on turn 2 of the final lap by Jeff Burton, who overtook Matt Kenseth for the lead in a classy finish.

Subway Fresh Fit 500

The eighth race of the season, the Subway Fresh Fit 500, was held at Phoenix International Raceway on April 21.  This was the third race to feature the Car of Tomorrow, as well as the season's first night race. Jeff Gordon captured his third pole of the season, tying him for fourth on the all-time poles list with Darrell Waltrip. Near the end of the race, he pulled away from Tony Stewart, winning the race and tying Dale Earnhardt's 76 wins. In the eyes of his son, Jeff Gordon pulled a class act and drove a "Polish Victory Lap" with the flag of his father's famous No. 3, but fans of "The Intimidator" threw cans and bottles of beer on the track (mainly Earnhardt Jr.'s sponsor Budweiser), and were criticized by the driver of the No. 8 car in the post-race news conference. Tony Stewart, who was leading when Jeff Gordon passed him following a caution was so irate about the outcome (even going as far to criticize that NASCAR "fixed" races much like professional wrestling on his satellite radio show later that week) blew off the mandatory appearance at the post-race media session, and was fined $10,000 (US) for doing so.

Aaron's 499

The Aaron's 499, the ninth race of the season, was held at Talladega Superspeedway on April 29.

Crown Royal presents the Jim Stewart 400

The tenth race of the season, the Crown Royal presents the Jim Stewart 400, was scheduled to be held at Richmond International Raceway on May 5.  This was the fourth race to feature the Car of Tomorrow.  The race was named after Jim Stewart of Houma, Louisiana who won an essay contest during the festivities leading up to the Daytona 500 sponsored by Crown Royal. The contest was so popular, it was repeated for the next four races at the track. Jeff Gordon captured his third straight pole by .01-second over second-place qualifier Carl Edwards. Dale Jarrett failed to qualify and missed his first Nextel Cup Race since the 1994 fall race at North Wilkesboro Speedway.

Dodge Avenger 500

The Dodge Avenger 500, NASCAR's eleventh race of the season, was held at Darlington Raceway on May 13. This was the fifth race to feature the Car of Tomorrow.  Clint Bowyer won his first career pole when he earned the pole position in qualifying.

The race marked the 50th anniversary of the first Rebel 300, run on Confederate Memorial Day weekend.  Ironically, like the inaugural Rebel exactly 50 years to the date of the rescheduled date, the 51st running of the "Rebel" was postponed because of rain itself.  Unlike 1957, when Darlington Raceway president Bob Colvin was fined for racing on Sunday, a violation of South Carolina Blue laws at that time, current regulations permit Sunday racing provided (1) the race was scheduled for greater than 250 miles or (2) if the race start was later than 1:30 pm.  The 501.367-mile distance made the race legal on Sunday.

(The September 1983 Busch Series race at Darlington, held on a Sunday as the Southern 500 was held on Monday, was 250 miles because of the law.  All other races at the track have been 200 miles on Friday or Saturday.)

Despite radiator problems, Jeff Gordon won his second Rebel, his first since 1996, when it was a 400-mile race.

This was also the first daytime race at Darlington since the Carolina Dodge Dealers 400 in March 2004.

NASCAR Nextel All-Star Challenge

The 23rd annual Nextel Open and All-Star Challenge, the second and final non-points event of the season, was held at Lowe's Motor Speedway on May 19. in the first rule changes since the "Survivor" theme was eliminated from the event (then known as The Winston) after the 2003 season.  Matt Kenseth earned the pole for the main event, while Martin Truex Jr. and Johnny Sauter overtook a fading pole sitter Carl Edwards to win the Nextel Open, and Kenny Wallace (a/k/a "Herman the German") voted in by the fans, but it was Kevin Harvick in the end winning the final quarter over defending champion Jimmie Johnson and the $1 million first prize.

Coca-Cola 600

The Coca-Cola 600, NASCAR's twelfth Nextel Cup race of the season, was held at Lowe's Motor Speedway on May 27.  This is the longest race run by the Cup Series (600 miles) and marks the official one-third mark of the season. Penske Racing South teammates Ryan Newman and Kurt Busch led a group of three Dodges to the green flag. One of the main factors of the 600 is not only the physical condition of the drivers, but the legend that Lowe's has of being an ever changing racetrack.

The "first phase" of the 600 was wild and crazy, with two cautions involving 21 cars in all. Fox commentator Darrell Waltrip even said that the race had a higher attrition rate than Bristol.The first wreck saw five-time Lowe's winner Jimmie Johnson lose his tire tread and start a multi-car pileup behind him. The second crash was more spectacular. The car of Tony Raines got loose and turned the car of Jeff Gordon into the grass. As Gordon came back across the track, the oncoming car of A. J. Allmendinger hit the right side door, jacking Gordon's car off the ground. Penske's dominance of the day would end in the night with a crash by Kurt Busch and a blown engine from Newman. Toyota, who had been struggling through the first third of the season, had only led a total of 15 laps. However, not only did both of Team Red Bull's cars make the race, but Brian Vickers carried the day for the manufacturer, leading 72 laps before power steering problems hit, but rallied for the marquee's first top five in Nextel Cup competition. Somehow, in the end, the longest race of the season would come down to who could go the longest on  gallons of fuel. Casey Mears, who had not won in 154 previous attempts, snapped his losing streak and joined teammate Jeff Gordon as well as Matt Kenseth, Bobby Labonte and David Pearson on the list of drivers who earned their first Cup win in the Coke 600.  Mears went straight to Victory Lane after running out of fuel after crossing the finish line. The race also saw Kyle Petty earn his first top 5 since the MBNA 400 at Dover in 1997.

Autism Speaks 400 presented by Visa

The Autism Speaks 400 presented by Visa, the thirteenth race of the season, was held at Dover International Speedway on June 4. Ryan Newman won his second consecutive pole. This was the sixth race to feature the Car of Tomorrow, as well as the last race broadcast by Fox in 2007.  The race also served as the halfway mark for the battle for entry into the 2007 Chase for the Nextel Cup. This race also marked the first time since Daytona that Michael Waltrip raced on Sunday, or because of the rainout, a Monday. In a twist of irony, Waltrip's teammate, David Reutimann, who had out-qualified or bumped his boss from the field many times before, failed to qualify for his second consecutive race. Martin Truex Jr. won his first NASCAR Nextel Cup race, leading 216 of the 400 laps.

Pocono 500

The Pocono 500, the fourteenth race of the season, was held at Pocono Raceway on June 10. Ryan Newman earned his third consecutive Budweiser Pole Award. In a delayed and postponed at lap 106 race, Jeff Gordon won his third Pocono 500.

Citizens Bank 400

The Citizens Bank 400, the fifteenth race of the season, was held at Michigan International Speedway on June 17. J. J. Yeley won his first career pole, and Carl Edwards won his first race in 52 races.  The race also saw Michael Waltrip, who has had a bad year since the Daytona qualifying fiasco, finish tenth in his No. 55 Toyota.

Toyota/Save Mart 350

The Toyota/Save Mart 350, NASCAR's sixteenth race of the season was held at Infineon Raceway on June 24. This was the seventh race to feature the Car of Tomorrow, and the first road course race of 2007.  For the first time in two years, Jamie McMurray won the pole position.

Much of the race was dominated by road course expert Robby Gordon, whose self-owned No. 7 Ford dominated the field, leading 48 laps. Robby hoped to win his first race since 2003 (also on a road course). However, through all the twists and turns, fuel mileage came into play after Joe Nemechek spun. Gordon's hopes were dashed when he was forced to make a pit stop for fuel. After his stop, the lead was given to McMurray, who had not won since 2002. However, McMurray would be chased by former-F1 driver Juan Pablo Montoya. Montoya passed McMurray (who was later forced to pit for a splash of fuel) with a few laps remaining and held off Daytona 500 winner Kevin Harvick to become the first Colombian born driver (and the third not to have been born in the USA) to win in a NASCAR Cup Series event. The win was even bigger for Montoya's car owner, Chip Ganassi who had struggled in previous years but would finally taste victory for the first time since 2002.

Lenox Industrial Tools 300

The Lenox Industrial Tools 300, the seventeenth race of the season and the eighth to feature the Car of Tomorrow, was held at New Hampshire International Speedway on July 1. Dave Blaney won the pole, his second career pole and the first for Toyota in Nextel Cup.

Pepsi 400

The Pepsi 400, NASCAR's eighteenth Nextel Cup race of the season, was held at Daytona International Speedway on July 7. The race officially marked the halfway point of the season. Coverage on TNT featured limited interruptions in a "wide open" production. In addition, this race was the last time the race was called the Pepsi 400, ending a 21-year sponsorship. Coca-Cola will gradually take over pouring rights at all ISC-owned tracks starting with the Daytona Speedweeks events in February 2008, and as a result, the race will be renamed the Coke Zero 400.

The biggest news to come out of this race was qualifying.  Boris Said in the No. 60 Ford was the fastest, but a rainstorm stopped the process, and under NASCAR rules, all cars must make a qualifying attempt before it is made official.  Six other cars not in the top 35 in owners' points were following Said, but Jeff Gordon would be on the pole as time trials were rained out, and the field was set by the NASCAR rulebook based on owner points.  Said would end up not even making the race because of this.

The race itself featured many twists and turns. Tony Stewart, Denny Hamlin, and Dale Earnhardt Jr., some of the race favorites, were taken out early in a wreck. Eventually, Jamie McMurray, suffering a 166 race winless slump (since October 2002 at Lowe's Motor Speedway), overcame a black flag penalty in the race and broke through to record his second career victory by only .005 seconds over Kyle Busch, becoming tied for the second-closest finish in NASCAR history, the closest coming in 2003 when Ricky Craven edged Kurt Busch at Darlington Raceway by .002 seconds.

USG Sheetrock 400

The USG Sheetrock 400, NASCAR's nineteenth race of the season was held at Chicagoland Speedway on July 15. Casey Mears won the pole. Of note, John Andretti, subbing for Kyle Petty who is currently in the TNT booth, qualified a surprise 9th, and Michael Waltrip made his fourth race of the season. Tony Stewart, who was in the midst of a 20-race winless streak and an altercation with teammate Denny Hamlin at Daytona, fended off challenges from Matt Kenseth and Jimmie Johnson to grab his first victory of the season.  Additionally, on September 25, Chicagoland Speedway officials announced that starting in 2008, the event would become a Saturday night race.

Allstate 400 at the Brickyard

The Allstate 400 at the Brickyard, the twentieth Nextel Cup race of the season was held at Indianapolis Motor Speedway on July 29.  It was the first Nextel Cup race to be broadcast by ESPN since the 2000 NASCAR season when they carried the NAPA 500 from Atlanta.  Additionally, this was the first time the Indianapolis event is scheduled for cable; the previous thirteen runnings of the race were broadcast on network television, either on ABC or NBC. Petty Enterprises driver and owner Kyle Petty made his 800th career NNCS start at the Brickyard. For the second consecutive year, rain washed out the Friday practice sessions, so there was one practice session and qualifying on Saturday, with Reed Sorenson claiming his first career pole. In addition, Toyota scored another top ten, with driver Dave Blaney finishing ninth, the best Toyota result since Brian Vickers finished fifth during the Coca-Cola 600.

Pennsylvania 500

The Pennsylvania 500, the twenty-first NNCS race of the season, was held at Pocono Raceway on August 5. Dale Earnhardt Jr. won his first pole since 2002.  Robby Gordon was taken out of the race by NASCAR officials after an incident in the Busch Series race in Montréal that led to his disqualification, and was replaced in the No. 7 car by P. J. Jones. The race was won by Kurt Busch, dominating by leading all but 25 of the 200 laps.

Centurion Boats at The Glen

The twenty-second race of the season, the Centurion Boats at The Glen, was held at Watkins Glen International on August 12.  This was the ninth race to feature the Car of Tomorrow, and was the second and final road course race of the season.

In the race, Jeff Gordon, who had been given the pole position due to the cancellation of qualifying due to rain, led the most laps, but Tony Stewart, who was in the lead when he spun out heading into turn one on Lap 45 of the 90-lap event, capitalized on the same error by Jeff Gordon with two laps remaining and wins his third race out of the last four. With his win, Stewart scored his 4th Watkins Glen victory, putting him in a tie with Jeff Gordon as the all-time NASCAR winner at the historical racetrack. In 2009 however, Stewart would pass Gordon as the all-time winner when he went on to win his 5th Watkins Glen race. As of 2020, that record still stands. Also with his win in that race, Tony Stewart scored his 6th career road course win, putting him in a 4-way tie for 2nd in all-time road course wins with Bobby Allison, Rusty Wallace, & Ricky Rudd. As of 2020 however, Tony Stewart is now in 2nd place with 8 road course wins, as Jeff Gordon currently holds the all-time record with 9 wins.

The race though was marred by an incident started by Martin Truex Jr. when he tapped Juan Pablo Montoya which chain reacted into Kevin Harvick and sent both Montoya and Harvick into a spin and a subsequent multi-car pileup which caused a red flag. Both Montoya and Harvick then got out of their cars and had a shoving match ending when Jeff Burton and officials separated the two drivers. Even though it was clear that Montoya was not at fault, Harvick blamed his accident on Montoya and threatened to "kick his ass." For that comment and his part in the feud, Kevin Harvick was put on indefinite probation by NASCAR because he violated the warning NASCAR gave him after intentionally crashing Scott Pruett at Montreal the previous week and later winning.

3M Performance 400

The 3M Performance 400, the twenty-third race of the season was scheduled to be held at Michigan International Speedway on August 19. The race sponsor moved from the June race to the August race in 2007. Jeff Gordon earned his sixth pole of the season, edging out Greg Biffle in the last qualifying attempt of the day.

Sharpie 500

The twenty-fourth race of the season, the Sharpie 500, was held at the repaved Bristol Motor Speedway on August 25.  This was the tenth race to feature the Car of Tomorrow.  In addition, this race was run on a reconfigured track where the infamous 36-degree high banks have been replaced by "progressively banked" turns between 24 and 30 degrees. Kasey Kahne won the pole. Carl Edwards won the race and held off Kahne, who led 305 laps, while Edwards led 182 laps, giving Ford their first CoT victory.

Sharp AQUOS 500

The twenty-fifth race of the season, the Sharp AQUOS 500, was held at California Speedway on September 2. Kurt Busch won the pole. His brother, Kyle Busch, dominated the race for 97 of 250 laps. However, it was his teammate, El Cajon native Jimmie Johnson, who won the race.

Chevy Rock & Roll 400

The twenty-sixth and final race of the "regular" season, the Chevy Rock & Roll 400, was held at Richmond International Raceway on September 8. This was the eleventh race to feature the Car of Tomorrow. Jimmie Johnson won the pole and the race. It was his sixth victory of the year, which meant that he starts the Chase at the top of the points. Bobby Labonte made his 500th career start.

Chase for the Nextel Cup

All ten of the races in the 2007 Chase for the Nextel Cup were broadcast on ABC.  The ten races were evenly split between the regular stock car and the Car of Tomorrow, with the CoT running at New Hampshire, Dover, Talladega, Martinsville and Phoenix.

Sylvania 300

The first race of the 2007 Chase for the Nextel Cup, the Sylvania 300, was held at New Hampshire International Speedway on September 16.  This was the twelfth race to feature the Car of Tomorrow. Clint Bowyer won the pole and entered the Chase as the only driver without a win. However, he would dominate the field, leading for 222 of 300 laps en route to his first career victory in 64 starts.

All 43 cars that started the race were running at the finish, the first time since North Wilkesboro in 1996 that every car starting the race finished.
{| class="wikitable"
|-
!colspan=5|Top ten results 
!rowspan=2|Failed to qualify 
|-
! Pos.
! No.
! Driver
! Car
! Team
|-
| 1.
| 07
| Clint Bowyer
| Chevrolet
| Richard Childress Racing
|Sam Hornish Jr. (No. 06) 
|-
| 2.
| 24
| Jeff Gordon
| Chevrolet
| Hendrick Motorsports
|Jeremy Mayfield (No. 36) 
|-
| 3.
| 20
| Tony Stewart
| Chevrolet
| Joe Gibbs Racing
|Kevin Lepage (No. 37) 
|-
| 4.
| 5
| Kyle Busch
| Chevrolet
| Hendrick Motorsports
|Dale Jarrett (No. 44) 
|-
| 5.
| 1
| Martin Truex Jr.
| Chevrolet
| Dale Earnhardt, Inc.
|Michael Waltrip (No. 55) 
|-
| 6.
| 48
| Jimmie Johnson
| Chevrolet
| Hendrick Motorsports
|Boris Said (No. 98)*
|-
| 7.
| 17
| Matt Kenseth
| Ford
| Roush Fenway Racing
|
|-
| 8.
| 25
| Casey Mears
| Chevrolet
| Hendrick Motorsports
|
|-
| 9.
| 12
| Ryan Newman
| Dodge
| Penske Racing
|
|-
| 10.
| 18
| J. J. Yeley
| Chevrolet
| Joe Gibbs Racing
|
|-
!colspan=6|John Andretti (No. 49) had qualified, but failed post-qualifying inspection, and his starting spot was given to Said.
|-
!colspan=6| Chase drivers are in bold italics|}

Dodge Dealers 400

The second race of the 2007 Chase was the Dodge Dealers 400, which was held at Dover International Speedway on September 23.  This was the thirteenth race to feature the Car of Tomorrow. Jimmie Johnson won his second pole of the season. Carl Edwards scored his third win of the season.

LifeLock 400

The third race of the 2007 Chase was the LifeLock 400, and was held at Kansas Speedway on September 30. Jimmie Johnson won the pole. For the second consecutive race, due to a crash in happy hour Jimmie had to start in the 43rd position, half of the Chase drivers struggled. Jeff Burton was sent to the "back of the longest line" for a rule violation during the first red flag for rain when he pulled on the right front fender, in a repeat of Fendergate, as NASCAR prohibits working on the cars during the red flag. Greg Biffle won the race after two rain delays shortened the event to 210 laps.

UAW-Ford 500

The fourth race of the 2007 Chase, the UAW-Ford 500, was held at Talladega Superspeedway on October 7.  This was the fourteenth race to feature the Car of Tomorrow, but it was the first to use them with restrictor plates.  Also, gear restrictions, which have not been used at restrictor plate races, but have been in use at other races since 2005, was also used for the first time at the track. Michael Waltrip won the pole, the second one for Toyota this season. Seven of the top ten cars were Toyotas. Jacques Villeneuve made his debut, while Sam Hornish Jr. went home again. In fact, the top eight speeds were from "go or go home" teams, as the next three highest speeds were locked out of the race by other teams that were not locked into the top 35 teams in the owners' points.

Jeff Gordon earned his 80th career victory and the points lead with a last lap charge on teammate Jimmie Johnson, sweeping both Talladega races of the season and bringing his total victories at the track to six. Third-placed Dave Blaney gave Toyota their best finish of the season to date. This would be the last race to be raced under the UAW-Ford 500 banner.  Starting in 2008, the race would be known as the AMP Energy 500.

Bank of America 500

The fifth race of the 2007 Chase, the Bank of America 500, was held at Lowe's Motor Speedway on October 13, and was the only Saturday night race in the Chase schedule. Ryan Newman won his fifth pole of the year, and swept both poles at Lowe's Motor Speedway.  The biggest surprise was that Brian Vickers, who drove to a top-five finish in the spring race, failed to make the field. After five consecutive DNF's at Lowe's, Jeff Gordon overcame a fuel issue, holding off Clint Bowyer and soon to be ex-teammate Kyle Busch for his first Charlotte victory since 1999. This race marked the 22nd and final time in his career that Jeff Gordon won back-to-back races. This race also featured Ned Jarrett as a guest on broadcasting, being his first broadcast experience since Atlanta in 2000.

Subway 500

The sixth race of the 2007 Chase, the Subway 500, was held at Martinsville Speedway on October 21.  This was the fifteenth race to feature the Car of Tomorrow. Jeff Gordon won the pole and Jimmie Johnson won the race.

Pep Boys Auto 500

The seventh race of the 2007 Chase, the Pep Boys Auto 500, was held at Atlanta Motor Speedway on October 28. Greg Biffle won his first pole of the season and Jimmie Johnson won his eighth race of the season.

Dickies 500

The eighth race of the 2007 Chase, the Dickies 500, was held at Texas Motor Speedway on November 4. Martin Truex Jr. won his first career pole. Jimmie Johnson won his third race in a row and ninth in the season, and took the point lead.

Checker Auto Parts 500 presented by Pennzoil

The ninth and penultimate race of the 2007 chase, the Checker Auto Parts 500, was held at Phoenix International Raceway on November 11. This was the sixteenth and final 2007 race to feature the Car of Tomorrow. Carl Edwards won the pole, and Jimmie Johnson won both his 10th race of the season and fourth consecutive race. Johnson became the 1st driver since teammate Jeff Gordon to score both 10 victories in a single season, and 4 consecutive wins. Both accomplishments by Gordon came in the same season as well, back in 1998. As of 2021, Johnson is the last driver to accomplish four consecutive victories. He would be the last driver to win 10 races in a single season until future Hendrick Motorsports driver Kyle Larson pulled it off 14 seasons later in 2021; with the 2010s became the 1st decade in NASCAR history that a driver failed to either score 10 victories in a single season, or win 4 consecutive races. Jeff Gordon ties Dale Jarrett for the Modern Era record of most Top 10 finishes in a single season with 29. Jarrett accomplished that feat in his Championship season in 1999.

Ford 400

The 2007 Nextel Cup season came to a close with the final race of the 2007 season at Homestead-Miami Speedway on November 18. The race observed two lasts: The last use of the fourth-generation car introduced in 1992, since the Car of Tomorrow would be used full-time in 2008, and the last race under the Nextel Cup banner. Sprint assumed the title sponsorship starting with the 2008 Daytona 500. Jimmie Johnson won his fourth pole of the season. Matt Kenseth dominated, leading 214 laps en route to his second win of 2007, and Johnson finished seventh, clinching the championship by 77 points over teammate Jeff Gordon. Gordon breaks out of a tie with Dale Jarrett and finished out the 2007 season with 30 top 10 finishes. As of 2020, this is a NASCAR Modern Era record. Jarrett accomplished 29 top 10 finishes in his Championship season in 1999.

 Full Driver standings 

(key) Bold - Pole position awarded by time. Italics - Pole position set by owner's points standings. * – Most laps led.

For full top 12 drivers standings, please see 2007 Chase for the Nextel Cup.

Television coverage
The 2007 season was the start of a new television package.  The contracts are for eight seasons, running until 2014.  NBC and FX both egressed after the 2006 season, and ESPN and ABC have returned after a six-year absence, with ESPN last broadcasting the series' NAPA 500 from Atlanta in November 2000, and ABC telecasting the Brickyard 400 in August of that same year.

Fox
Fox carried the first part of the season beginning with Speedweeks at Daytona, and continued coverage up through the June race held at the Dover International Speedway, with Fox-owned Speed Channel carrying the Gatorade Duel at Daytona qualifying races and the Nextel All-Star Challenge/Nextel Open doubleheader.  Mike Joy, Larry McReynolds, and Darrell Waltrip returned to the broadcast booth for Fox.  Fox also planned to carry two Craftsman Truck Series races March 31 and May 26, with Speed carrying the remainder of the series. The March 31 race at Martinsville was shown successfully on Fox, but the telecast for the May 26 race at Mansfield, OH was moved to Speed Channel after lap 50 due to rain delays.

TNT
TNT covered six mid-season races in June and July dubbed the "NASCAR Summer Series" including the Pepsi 400.  The commentators included announcers Bill Weber and Wally Dallenbach Jr.  Kyle Petty replaced Benny Parsons and also drove and did commentary from his car during the June 24 race at Sonoma, which turned out at the outset of the race to be rather embarrassing as he uttered "What the fuck was that?" in a replay of how he was involved in an accident. TNT used Hinder's cover of the Steppenwolf classic rock anthem "Born to Be Wild" as part of their race broadcast.

ESPN/ABC
ESPN and ABC carried all races beginning with the Allstate 400 at the Brickyard in late July on ESPN running up through the Labor Day weekend race at California and ABC picking up their part of the package with the final pre-chase race at Richmond and the entire Chase for the Nextel Cup.   Jerry Punch served as the play-by-play and Rusty Wallace and Andy Petree served as color commentators.  Punch last worked for the network as a pit reporter on IRL events such as the Indianapolis 500, and has also filled in on the play-by-play of NASCAR races prior to 2001, mostly during coverage of NASCAR Busch Series races, which ESPN2 and ABC will carried full-time starting in 2007.  Wallace is the 1989 NASCAR Cup Series champion.  They were joined by newcomer Andy Petree, a former team owner and Dale Earnhardt's crew chief in 1993 and 1994.  Brent Musburger and Suzy Kolber served as the hosts on both ESPN and ABC.  Rock group Aerosmith kicked off each broadcast with a live version of their big 1970s FM hit "Back in the Saddle" that was filmed in concert in Las Vegas.

Rookies
For the second consecutive year, the fight for ROTY was expected to be fierce, as competitors from all areas or racing expertise battled in NASCAR's top level. The most profiled rookie was ex-Formula One driver Juan Pablo Montoya, driving Chip Ganassi Racing's No. 42 Dodge vacated by Casey Mears. Montoya would permanently leave F1 after a fallout with his boss, Ron Dennis. Montoya was widely criticized for his over-aggressive driving style in his open-wheel days. Although this came to be true in the early part of the season, Montoya, with help from his owner, teammates, and crew chiefs, managed to tame his aggressive nature and translate it into his first ever win at Infineon Raceway, becoming the first foreign driver to win a race since Earl Ross of Canada at Martinsville in 1974. The win would propel Montoya to be the first ever foreign-born driver to win ROTY. Runner-up David Ragan had big shoes to fill, as he would be taking over the legendary No. 6 ride for veteran Mark Martin. Despite his limited experience in NASCAR, having only run part-time in the ARCA RE/MAX Series and the Craftsman Truck Series, Ragan would make a splash with a fifth-place finish in the Daytona 500. After that, he would have an up and down year, gaining experience along the way. As Montoya and Ragan were the only two drivers with guaranteed starting spots, the rest of the rookies were trying to make races with new teams. Busch Series driver Paul Menard continued his relationship with DEI, but struggled to make races until the DEI-Ginn merger (see "Merger Mania" section). Another open wheel immigrant, ex-Champ Car driver A. J. Allmendinger struggled to adjust to stock cars, and his development as a driver was further hampered with his allegiance with Toyota, a new manufacturer. Former Truck Series driver David Reutimann also struggled with a new team and manufacturer, and like Allmendinger and Menard, was out of the critical top 35 in owners points. Brandon Whitt attempted at least a partial schedule with CJM Racing, but after missing race after race, the team decided to release Whitt and move down to the Busch Series.

Test schedule
In 2006, NASCAR instituted a new track testing policy that set a schedule for when and where NASCAR Nextel Cup Series tests were conducted. These scheduled tests are the only opportunities that the NNCS teams will have to test their cars at NNCS tracks.

The testing issue has become a controversy because teams, especially Chevrolet teams, have been testing their cars at various non-NNCS tracks listed below in the "Notes" section. All test reports are being telecast on Speed Channel.

(*) – Even numbered finishers in the 2006 Nextel Cup standings.
(**) – Odd numbered finishers in the 2006 Nextel Cup standings.
(≈) – Only one day was used as this was extended by NASCAR to three sessions due to an oncoming rainstorm on March 1.CoT – Car of Tomorrow.''Notes:''' The scheduled tests for Dover on May 14–15 were cancelled due to the rainout of the Dodge Avenger 500 from May 12 to 13.  The tests of Atlanta Motor Speedway were added on August 22 as the replacement for Dover.

In addition to these tests, Goodyear (in conjunction with NASCAR) stages closed practices to test tire combinations for NNCS tracks.

NASCAR does not limit testing at non-Nextel Cup Series circuits (using Hoosier, Michelin, or non-current Goodyear tires) such as Kentucky, Rockingham, Greenville-Pickens Speedway, Milwaukee, Nashville, or USA International Speedway.  Many teams also use Virginia International Raceway for road course testing.

See also
2007 NASCAR Busch Series
2007 NASCAR Craftsman Truck Series
2007 NASCAR Busch East Series
2007 NASCAR Canadian Tire Series
2007 NASCAR Corona Series
2007 Chase for the NEXTEL Cup
List of NASCAR all-time cup winners
2007 in sports

Notes and references

External links and sources
 Official NASCAR site
 RacingOne 
 Jayski's Silly Season Site
 Speed Channel
 ThatsRacin.com
 Racing-Reference.info
 Rudd Won't Drive No. 28

 
NASCAR Cup Series seasons